Joanna Connor (born August 31, 1962) is an American Chicago-based blues singer, songwriter and virtuosa guitarist.

Early life 
Connor was born in Brooklyn of New York City, and raised in Worcester, Massachusetts. After moving to Chicago in 1984, she was drawn to the Chicago blues scene, eventually sharing the stage with James Cotton, Junior Wells, Buddy Guy and A.C. Reed.

Music career 

By 1987, Connor had started her own band, and recorded her first album for Blind Pig Records in 1989.

In 2002, Connor left Blind Pig Records, and signed a recording contract with M.C. Records (a small independent record label).

In 2021, Connor released the No. 1 blues album 4801 South Indiana Avenue, via Joe Bonamassa's Keeping the Blues Alive Records.

While on tour in 2022, Connor performed live at Kingston Mines, a blues club.

Discography

Albums 
 Believe It! (Blind Pig Records) (1989)
 Fight (Blind Pig Records) (1992) 
 Living On The Road (1993) 
 Rock & Roll Gypsy (Ruf Records) (1995) 
 Big Girl Blues (Blind Pig Records) (1996) 
 Slidetime (Blind Pig Records) (1998) 
 Nothing But The Blues (live in Germany) (2001) 
 The Joanna Connor Band (M.C. Records) (2002) 
 Mercury Blues (M.C. Records) (2003) 
 Unplugged at Carterco with Lance Lewis (Bluesblaster Records) (2008) 
 Live 24 (live at Kingston Mines) (2010) 
 Six String Stories (M.C. Records) (2016) 
 Rise (M.C. Records) (2019) 
 4801 South Indiana Avenue (KTBA Records) (2021)

Singles 
 "Slippin' Away" (Da Music/Deutsche Austrophon) (1995)
 "I Feel So Good" (KTBA Records) (2021)

References

External links 
Official Joanna Connor website

1962 births
Living people
American blues guitarists
American blues singers
American women singers
Songwriters from New York (state)
Musicians from Brooklyn
Guitarists from New York (state)
20th-century American guitarists
Ruf Records artists
Blind Pig Records artists
20th-century American women guitarists
21st-century American women